This is a list of Estonian winter football transfers between the 2009 and 2010 seasons.

The winter transfer window in Estonia opens on January 10 or if the date happens to be in the weekend, on the next available weekday, which in 2010 was January 11. For international transfers, the window closed on February 28 at 17:00. Local transfers had to be completed the day before the first match in the league.

Meistriliiga

Flora

Kalju

Levadia

Lootus

Paide LM

Sillamäe Kalev

Tulevik

References

Estonia
transfers
transfers
2009–10